This is a list of articles on public policy topics, arranged by country.

Australia
Energy policy of Australia
Australian immigration policies
Visa policy of Australia

Bolivia
Domestic policy of Evo Morales
Foreign policy of Evo Morales

Brazil
Energy policy of Brazil
Same-sex immigration policy in Brazil

Canada

Arctic policy of Canada
Domestic policy of the Harper government
Drug policy of Canada
Economic policy of the Harper government
Energy policy of Canada
Environmental policy of the Harper government
Foreign policy of the Harper government
Language policies of Canada's provinces and territories
Legal dispute over Quebec's language policy

Chile

China
Hong Kong cultural policy
Energy policy of China
Stem cell laws and policy in China
Arctic policy of China

Ecuador
Foreign policy of Rafael Correa

European Union
Common Agricultural Policy
Cultural policies of the European Union
Common Security and Defence Policy
Energy policy of the European Union
Space policy of the European Union
Arctic policy of the European Union

France
Domestic policy of Nicolas Sarkozy
Foreign policy of François Mitterrand
Language policy in France

Germany
 Nazi Foreign Policy (debate)
 Visa policy of Germany

India
Energy policy of India
Environmental policy of the Government of India
Visa policy of India

Iran
Labour and tax laws in Iran
Foreign policy of Mahmoud Ahmadinejad

Japan
Defence policy of Japan
Foreign policy of Japan
Industrial policy of Japan
International economic cooperation policy of Japan
Monetary and fiscal policy of Japan
Trade policy of Japan
Visa policy of Japan

Kazakhstan
Energy policy of Kazakhstan

Laos
Drug policy in Laos

Latvia
Language policy in Latvia

Malaysia
National Development Policy
Energy policy of Malaysia

Myanmar
Foreign policy of Myanmar

Morocco

Netherlands
Drug policy of the Netherlands

Pakistan
Pakistan national energy policy

Portugal
Drug policy of Portugal

Romania
Energy policy of Romania

Russia
Energy policy of Russia
Foreign policy of Vladimir Putin
Arctic policy of Russia

South Korea
Immigration Policy of Korea

Soviet Union
Drug policy of the Soviet Union
Energy policy of the Soviet Union

Sri Lanka
National Medicinal Drugs Policy

Sweden
Drug policy of Sweden
Monetary policy of Sweden

Turkey
Foreign policy of the Recep Tayyip Erdoğan government

United Kingdom
Energy policy of the United Kingdom
Energy policy of Scotland

United States

Agricultural policy of the United States
Arctic policy of the United States
Climate change policy of the United States
Climate change policy of the George W. Bush administration
Domestic policy of the United States
Domestic policy of the Ronald Reagan administration
Domestic policy of the George W. Bush administration
Drug policy of the United States
Drug policy of California
Drug policy of Colorado
Drug policy of Maryland
Drug policy of Virginia
Economic policy of the United States
Economic policy of the George W. Bush administration
Economic policy of the Barack Obama administration
Education policy of the United States
Energy policy of the United States
Energy policy of the Barack Obama administration
Environmental policy of the United States
Fiscal policy of the United States
Foreign policy of the United States
History of U.S. foreign policy
Criticism of American foreign policy
Foreign policies of American presidents
Foreign policy of the Ronald Reagan administration
Foreign policy of the Bill Clinton administration
Foreign policy of the George W. Bush administration
Foreign policy of the Barack Obama administration
East Asian foreign policy of the Barack Obama administration
European foreign policy of the Barack Obama administration
Middle Eastern foreign policy of the Barack Obama administration
South Asian foreign policy of the Barack Obama administration
Gun control policy of the United States
Gun control policy of the Clinton Administration
Immigration policy of the United States
U.S. immigration policy toward the People's Republic of China
Visa policy of the United States
Immigration policy of the Donald Trump administration
Immigration policy of the Joe Biden administration
Monetary policy of the United States
Nuclear policy of the United States
Low-level radioactive waste policy of the United States
Science policy of the United States
Social policy of the United States
Social policy of the Barack Obama administration
Space policy of the United States
Space policy of the George W. Bush administration
Space policy of the Barack Obama administration
Space policy of the Donald Trump administration
Stem cell laws and policy in the United States
Telecommunications policy of the United States
Trade policy of the United States
Transportation policy of the United States
Water resource policy of the United States

Uruguay
Nuclear energy policy of Uruguay

Vatican City
Multilateral foreign policy of the Holy See

Venezuela
Economic policy of the Hugo Chávez government
Energy policy of Venezuela
Foreign policy of the Hugo Chávez government

Zaire
Foreign policy of Mobutu Sese Seko

See also
:Category:Foreign relations by country
Nuclear energy policy by country

Public policy